Olivier Grouillard (born 2 September 1958) is a racing driver from France. He started racing go-karts from the age of fourteen competing in events such as the Volant Elf. He progressed to Formula Renault winning the title before Grouillard competed in F3000 from 1985 to 1988 taking two wins. He also participated in the Birmingham Superprix but did not start the race.

In 1989, Grouillard joined the Ligier Formula One team before joining the Osella team for 1990 and 1991 when the team was renamed Fondmetal. His last season came in 1992, when Grouillard drove for Tyrrell. He left the sport following the year without receiving offers for a drive in 1993. After leaving Formula One, Grouillard raced in the CART PPG World Series, competing in the Indianapolis 500 for which he did not qualify but showed consistency. Grouillard became well known for driving in Sports Cars between 1994 and 2001 having success. During his time in Sports Cars, he raced in the BPR Global GT Series, the FIA GT Championship, the Daytona 24 Hours, the Le Mans 24 Hours and the American Le Mans Series. He retired from motorsport at the end of 2001.

Career

Before Formula One
Grouillard was born, in Fenouillet. He started racing karts from the age of 14 and competed in the Volant Elf in 1981 and progressed to Formula Renault in 1982 and took the title. In 1983, Grouillard went into French F3 and drove for the ORECA team racing a Martini Mk39 Alfa Romeo to finish 4th scoring 33 points. Driving a Martini Mk42 brought him the title and scored 108 points. For 1985, Grouillard competed in the inaugural season of F3000 spending the year mostly confined to qualifying in the midfield but delivered good races along with reliability. In 1986, he left ORECA to join Formula Team Ltd driving a Lola T86/50 Cosworth. At Mugello, Grouillard finished 4th despite taking an early lead. At the Osterrichring he took 6th and overall scored 4 points despite limited participation as the team was short on funding. Grouillard returned to ORECA for 1987 in a March 87B Cosworth. His performances dropped despite having impressive qualifying record throughout the season. For 1988, Grouillard moved to the GBDA Motorsport driving a Lola T88/50 Cosworth. He once again showed potential during qualifying and was regularly scoring points along with wins. Grouillard was slightly injured in a crash during the 1988 Birmingham Superprix sustaining bruised ankles although observers initially thought that Grouillard had broken both his legs. Grouillard was able to start the race but had to run to the pit lane for the spare car after his car suffered a failure with the engine. Grouillard however, did not start the race.

Olivier also raced a series of works and semi-works BMW M3's for BMW in the 1987 World Touring Car Championship and the 1988 European Touring Car Championships

Formula One

1989
Grouillard joined Ligier to fill in the seat left by Stefan Johansson and was the team-mate to René Arnoux for 1989. He qualified 22nd in his first race in Brazil and finished 9th. At Imola, he overcame spinning his car to start in 10th, but was disqualified when mechanics worked on his car during a red flag stint, caused by the accident of Gerhard Berger at Tamburello. He started outside the top 10 at Monaco and Mexico, finishing 8th in the latter but was unable to qualify in Phoenix and Montréal. He started from 17th at his home race at the French Grand Prix and drove to 6th, despite having issues with the tyres and gearbox, scoring his only World Championship point. For the last six races, Grouillard failed to qualify higher than 20th and did not qualify in Portugal. In qualifying for the Belgian Grand Prix at Spa, Grouillard impeded the Lotus of Nelson Piquet by staying on the racing line whilst the Brazilian was on his last flying lap. On the dirty line, Piquet spun off and shook his fist at Grouillard as he passed by. This cost the triple World Champion his chances in qualifying and the race, and it was to be the first of such incidents involving Grouillard's misuse of his mirrors. At Adelaide, he spun which followed a heavy crash in the rain. In fact, for the season ending Australian Grand Prix in Adelaide, he kept the Ligier mechanics busy by spinning off and hitting the concrete walls twice during practice and qualifying as well as in the race morning warm up session (which was wet) and the race.

During his last 2–3 seasons in Formula One, René Arnoux had gained the reputation of being a blocker, a driver who rarely used his mirrors and regularly held up others both in qualifying and races. Unfortunately this trait seemed to have been passed on to Grouillard who was fast gaining his own reputation of being a blocker.

1990
Grouillard joined the Italian Osella team, taking the seat of Nicola Larini, who in return took Grouillard's seat at Ligier. He was not partnered for 1990 as the financially struggling Osella scaled back their operations, meaning Grouillard had to pre-qualify for the races. He managed to qualify in 8th in Phoenix ahead of Nigel Mansell and Alessandro Nannini which amazed many people in Formula One. During the race, Grouillard was hit by Riccardo Patrese's Williams at the second corner and eventually retired after a second collision with the Swiss driver Gregor Foitek. At Brazil, he retired after another collision involving Michele Alboreto. For Imola the car was upgraded, but that did not help the team as Grouillard retired (not before blocking Mansell in qualifying and ruining the Ferrari's qualifying run, earning the Frenchman a fist wave from Mansell, and not for the last time). He also failed to qualify at Monaco. Two consecutive finishes outside the top 10 at Canada and Mexico were followed up with a poor run in pre-qualifying for France, ending up not qualifying for the race and at Silverstone and Hockenheim, where he also failed to qualify along with another failure to pre-qualify at Hungary. Grouillard finished 16th at Spa with retirements at Monza and Jerez with wheel bearing problems that plagued the Frenchman throughout the year.

At the season ending Australian Grand Prix in Adelaide, Grouillard finished 13th and again held up Nigel Mansell during the race which led to the British driver shaking his fist at the Frenchman in front of the on-board camera.

1991
Grouillard remained with Osella, which had been bought out and renamed to Fondmetal. The team had to race with the car used for the two previous years, which led to Grouillard not being able to get past pre-qualifying at Phoenix and Interlagos. A new car was built, but this did not change Grouillard's season, as he had further three failures to pre-qualify. A change of fortune did come at Mexico, where he qualified his season-best 10th, but was forced to start from the pit lane after suffering from mechanical problems in the car, and he eventually succumbed to an engine failure after 14 laps. He retired in his home race at France with an oil leak, and had further failures to pre-qualify at Silverstone and Hockenheim. In Hungary, Grouillard managed to get into the main qualifying event, but eventually failed to qualify. At Spa-Francorchamps, he finished a lap down in 10th and retired from an engine failure at Monza with just 7 laps to go. Grouillard failed to qualify in Portugal, and had to take a spare gearbox, with the old one failing to work. He refused to let the car use a new gearbox, and was sacked a few days later by team boss Gabriele Rumi. He managed to join AGS in the seat vacated by his replacement at Fondmetal, Gabriele Tarquini, for the next race at Catalunya. For the race, Grouillard was the slowest in pre-qualifying behind new team-mate Fabrizio Barbazza, with the AGS team folding before the pair could get to Japan and Australia.

1992
Grouillard was taken on by Ken Tyrrell to drive the Ilmor-powered Tyrrell 020B chassis and was partnered by Italian Andrea de Cesaris. He was learning from de Cesaris' experience, and often qualified in the midfield. His car had the share of mechanical problems, but managed to finish in San Marino, Canada, France and Britain. A collision with a wall in Spain, along with a collision with Karl Wendlinger's March in Hungary, a spin on the opening lap at Spa, a collision with Pierluigi Martini's Dallara in Adelaide had brought himself unrepentant about his manners whilst racing. He was eventually not wanted by other teams, and left Formula One at the end of the season. Grouillard and other French racing drivers lobbied for leading motorsport events, such as the French motorcycle Grand Prix to be saved, after they were put at risk by the new anti-tobacco laws in France brought in by health minister Claude Évin.

CART
Grouillard arranged to drive with the Indy Regency Team in a Lola T92/00 for 1993 in the CART PPG World Series following Nigel Mansell in the series. His first race was the Indianapolis 500, where he did not qualify. After the 500, Grouillard showed consistency and had a reliable car finishing in eight out of 11 events with only one mechanical retirement at Michigan and a collision with Arie Luyendyk at Vancouver. Overall, Grouillard finished 28th overall taking four points.

Sports Car racing

1994–2001
Unable to make a success in CART, he returned to Europe in 1994 and raced sports cars in the BPR Global GT series. He had previous experience in 1990 where he and co-drivers Martin Donnelly and Kenny Acheson qualified 5th at Le Mans but gearbox problems prevented the trio from starting. He came 16th in a Venturi 400 Trophy with Herve Pulain coming in 4th in GT5 class before driving five races in an Agusta Racing Team Venturi 600LM with Christophe Bouchut taking 2nd at Montlehry and 5th at Vallelunga and also raced at Le Mans in a Jacadi Racing Venturi 600Lm with Michel Ferté and Michel Neugarten with engine problems ending their race.

The Jacadi connection remained in 1995 with Grouillard joined by Fabien Giroix in a Giroix Racing Team Jacadi McLaren F1 GTR for 3 rounds in the BPR series with a 5th at Jarama and 2nd at the Nurburgring. The pair were joined by Jean-Denis Délétraz at Le Mans, where they finished 5th. Grouillard departed for Mach One Racing joining Andy Wallace winning all three rounds the new pairing entered. Grouillard scored 91 points and finished 14th overall. In the first qualifying race at Nogaro, Grouillard's car suffered a faulty shock absorber.

He remained with Mach One, and Harrods came on board as sponsor. Retirements plagued the team for the first four rounds were remedied by victory at Silverstone and a 6th at Le Mans where they were joined by Derek Bell. Further finishes came at Anderstorp, Suzuka and Brands Hatch where he came 4th, 3rd and 2nd respectively. Grouillard failed to qualify at Spa in a Friesinger Motorsport Porsche 911 GT2 Evo shared with Wolfgang Kaufmann and at Nogaro driving a BBA Competition Mclaren F1 GTP with Jean-Luc Maury-Lariberre, he failed to finish. Grouillard finished 8th with 106 points. Throughout the season, he also competed in other events such as the Daytona 24 Hours with Derek Hill and Gildo Pastor Pallanca with a transmission problem forcing the trio out.

Grouillard entered the FIA GT Championship in 1997 in a Dave Price Racing Panoz GTP Ford, teamed up with David Brabham and Perry McCarthy and also competed in Japanese GT finishing 2nd at Suzuka in a Toyota Supra with Masami Kageyama. For that year's Le Mans race, Grouillard drove in a Courage Compétition C36 Porsche with Mario Andretti and his son Michael, but retired after fifteen and a half hours.

He returned to the race in 1998, driving a La Filiere Courage C36 Porsche with Henri Pescarolo and Franck Montagny managing to finish 16th. Grouillard's other entry was the International Sports Racing Series at Misano, but did not compete as his entrant failed to attend the race.

For 2000, Grouillard raced in the American Le Mans Series driving a Courage C52 Peugeot with Sébastien Bourdais coming 6th at Silverstone and entered the Nurburgring round but did not take part in practice. At Le Mans, he finished 4th.

In 2001, Grouillard looked to join Pescarolo Sport at Le Mans but was replaced by Boris Derichebourg ending Grouillard's motorsport career.

Racing record

Career summary

Complete International Formula 3000 results
(key) (Races in bold indicate pole position; races in italics indicate fastest lap.)

Complete Formula One results
(key)

24 Hours of Le Mans results

CART results
(key)

Complete JGTC results
(key) (Races in bold indicate pole position) (Races in italics indicate fastest lap)

References

External links
Profile at www.grandprix.com

1958 births
Living people
Sportspeople from Haute-Garonne
French racing drivers
French Formula One drivers
Ligier Formula One drivers
Osella Formula One drivers
Fondmetal Formula One drivers
AGS Formula One drivers
Tyrrell Formula One drivers
French Formula Three Championship drivers
Champ Car drivers
International Formula 3000 drivers
24 Hours of Le Mans drivers
World Touring Car Championship drivers
24 Hours of Spa drivers
Oreca drivers
David Price Racing drivers
Nismo drivers
Pescarolo Sport drivers
La Filière drivers